A shuttle train is a train that runs back and forth between two points, especially if it offers a frequent service over a short route.  Shuttle trains are used in various ways, in various parts of the world.  They commonly operate as a fixed consist, and run non-stop between their termini.   They can be used to carry passengers, freight, or both.

Examples

Airport shuttle trains
An airport shuttle train  may run between an airport and some other location, or connect two or more terminals. The second is usually in the form of a driverless people mover.

Canada

The UP Express train in Toronto, Ontario connects you to the Pearson Airport, making secondary stops at Bloor and Weston from Union Station. The train connects with the provincial transit network, GO Transit and the city-wide underground subway network, the Toronto subway.

Italy
A shuttle train connects Galileo Galilei Airport in Pisa with Pisa Central railway station. It operates daily and takes five minutes.

United Kingdom
The Gatwick Airport Shuttle Transit is a people mover used to transfer passengers between the North and South Terminals at London Gatwick Airport. It runs every few minutes 24 hours a day, and the journey takes two minutes.

Car shuttle trains

A car shuttle train is used to transport accompanied automobiles, and usually also other types of road vehicles, for a relatively short distance.  Car shuttle trains usually operate on lines passing through a rail tunnel and connecting two places not easily accessible to each other by road.  On car shuttle train services, the occupants of the road vehicles being carried on the train usually stay with their vehicle throughout the rail journey.

Commuter shuttle trains
A shuttle train may be used to carry commuters, especially if at least one of the shuttle train's termini is an interchange station.

Japan
During the morning rush hour, the Aichi Loop Line shuttle train runs over the Aichi Loop Line between Mikawa-Toyota Station and Shin-Toyota Station in Toyota, Aichi Prefecture, Japan.
The northeastern end of the Tokyo Metro Chiyoda Line is single-tracked although the depot line runs in parallel. Trains serving the terminus are shuttles to the penultimate stop, Ayase.

The first section of the Fukutoshin Line of the Tokyo Metro was named the 'New Line', with shuttle trains running express in parallel with the Yurakucho Line, between the Ikebukuro and Kotake-mukaihara stations.

New Zealand
A diesel shuttle train runs between Papakura and Pukekohe on the Southern Line in Auckland, New Zealand as this section of the line has not yet been electrified. Battery powered EMUs have been ordered and will replace the ADL/ADC class DMU shuttle in 2019.

United States
There are three shuttle services in the New York City Subway, as well as several other non-shuttle services cut back to shuttle portions during overnights.  However, of these services, only the 42nd Street Shuttle is a true shuttle that stops only at two locations.  Five shuttle services were formerly run in the subway.

The Yellow Line on the Chicago "L" originally ran as a nonstop shuttle from Dempster Street in Skokie to Howard Street in Chicago, offering connections to the Red and Purple Lines. In 2012, an infill station opened on Oakton Street, no longer making the Yellow Line a true shuttle.

NJ Transit's Princeton Branch, or "dinky", is a shuttle line.

Unit Trains that are dedicated to move on a regular basis between origin and destination are known as shuttle trains by the Union Pacific Railroad and the BNSF Railway

Others

Austria
The National Intermodal Network Austria, operated by Rail Cargo Austria, uses a hub-and-spoke system of shuttle trains to provide overnight links between the highest volume intermodal freight terminals in Austria.  The hub of the network is located at Wels.

Hong Kong
The MTR Disneyland Resort line is a themed shuttle line linking the Hong Kong Disneyland Resort with the rest of the network. Another shuttle train runs between the Tseung Kwan O and LOHAS Park stations, on a spur serving a new residential development.

Spain
The R line, part of the Madrid subway, is a shuttle line connecting Ópera station (lines 2 and 5) with Príncipe Pío station (lines 6 and 10).

Switzerland
The Zermatt shuttle connects the mountaineering and ski resort of Zermatt (which has no road access) with nearby Täsch, where people travelling to and from Zermatt by motor vehicles are required to park their cars.  For the better part of most days, the service operates every 20 min and takes 12 min.

United Kingdom
The Waterloo and City Line on the London Underground runs between Waterloo and Bank in the City.

The Butetown Branch Line runs between Cardiff Queen Street and Cardiff Bay.

The Stourbridge Town Branch Line runs between Stourbridge Junction and Stourbridge Town

See also

Express train
High-speed rail
Luxury train
Shuttle bus

References

Trains
Rail transport articles in need of updating